Kampong Bukit Udal is a village in Tutong District, Brunei, about  from the district town Pekan Tutong. It is one of the villages within Mukim Tanjong Maya, a mukim in the district.

Facilities 
Bukit Udal Primary School is the village primary school. It also shares grounds with Bukit Udal Religious School, the village school for the primary level of the country's Islamic religious education.

Kampong Bukit Udal Mosque is the village mosque. It was built in 1995 and can accommodate 200 worshippers.

References 

Bukit Udal